The Braille Night is the fifth studio album by American indie rock duo Ida, released in 2001 on Tiger Style Records.

Track listing
"Let's Go Walking" (D. Littleton/Mitchell/Schickele/M. Littleton) – 3:59
"Ignatia Amara" (Littleton) – 2:44
"Arrowheads" (Karla Schickele)  – 3:57
"So Long" (Littleton/Fisher) – 5:46
"Blizzard of '78" (Littleton) – 7:19
"So Worn Out" (Littleton) – 2:33
"The Braille Night" (Pearle/Littleton) – 2:04
"Gladiolas" (Mitchell/Littleton) – 5:44
"Ocean of Glass" (Littleton) – 4:05
"Moves Through the Air" (Littleton) – 9:13

Personnel
Musicians
 Elizabeth Mitchell – vocals, guitar, wurlitzer, thumb piano, piano
 Daniel Littleton – vocals, guitar, melodica, organ, piano
 Karla Schickele – vocals, bass, thumb piano, piano
 Ida Pearle – violin
 Michael Littleton – drums, guitar
 Rick Lassiter – upright bass
 Zach Wallace – upright bass
 Luther Gray – drums, percussion

Technical Personnel
 Warn Defever – recording and mixing
 Trina Shoemaker – recording and mixing
 Steve Fallon – mixing

Graphics
 Ida Pearle – artwork
 Erin Courtney – lettering
 Rebecca Jane Gleason – photography
 Nick Pimentel – layout

References 

2001 albums
Ida (band) albums